The 1992–93 Hong Kong First Division League season was the 82nd since its establishment.

League table

References
1992–93 Hong Kong First Division table (RSSSF)

Hong Kong First Division League seasons
Hong
1